The Colombia women's national basketball team is the official women's basketball team for Colombia. It is administered by the Federación Colombiana de Baloncesto.

Tournament record

FIBA World Championship
 1975 – 7th place

FIBA Americas Championship
 1997 – 6th place
 2011 – 7th place
 2017 – 7th place
 2019 – 5th place
 2021 – 5th place

Current roster
Roster for the 2021 FIBA Women's AmeriCup.

See also
Colombia women's national under-19 basketball team
Colombia women's national under-17 basketball team
Colombia women's national 3x3 team

References

External links

FIBA profile
Colombia at FIBA Americas
Colombia Basketball Records at FIBA Archive

 
Women's national basketball teams in South America
 
Women's basketball in Colombia